Philosophy Sharing Foundation, or PSF, is a non-profit organisation founded in Malta in 2012. Its mission is to bring together philosophy enthusiasts; to inspire, strengthen and promote philosophical activity in the Maltese Islands; and to contribute towards society through Philosophy. The foundation does not adhere to, or profess, any single creed or ideology. Its official languages are Maltese and English.

Establishment

The original idea to create a society in order to provide meeting opportunities, and perhaps study prospects, for members of the general public who were interested in philosophy came from Peter Serracino Inglott. Though he intended to give the initiative a go, he was impeded by his untimely death in March 2012. Subsequently, however, just a few weeks after his death a group of academics, intellectuals and other members of the community came together to bring the idea to fruition. The foundation was established on 21 May 2012, by public act. It started its public operations on the following 22 June.

PSF is registered with the Commission for Voluntary Organisation (VO-0679) and, for the purposes of Maltese law, it is to be considered as a Legal Person (LPF-85).

Objectives

The objectives of PSF are:

 to bring together Maltese philosophers, facilitate discussion of their ideas, and encourage their work;
 to promote philosophical investigation;
 to share philosophical ideas with the Maltese public;
 to assist the documentation, compilation, safe-keeping, and accessibility of the works of Maltese philosophers;
 to disseminate information on Maltese philosophers, their work and their ideas;
 to foster the participation of Maltese philosophers in public debates; and
 to further philosophical understanding and knowledge in general.

Activities

The activities of PSF include:

 organising encounters for Maltese philosophers;
 encouraging and facilitating the writing, publication and distribution of works by Maltese philosophers;
 furthering research on past and present Maltese philosophers;
 establishing a central archive with the works of Maltese philosophers;
 coordinating courses, meetings, seminars, conferences and such like gatherings; and
 collaborating with entities which can aid the foundation in its objectives and activities.

Long-term objectives

The long-term objectives of PSF include:

 publishing a periodical for the sharing of ideas; 
 setting up an outlet for the sale of material related to philosophy; 
 starting an editorial house for the publishing of books on philosophy and other related subjects; and
 affiliating the foundation to an established local or foreign institution of higher education for the conferment of academic recognition in philosophy.

Membership and management

PSF grants membership to who, graduate in philosophy or not, agrees with the mission and objectives of the foundation.	Members pay a nominal annual fee.

The foundation is governed by a number of members forming a steering committee, two of which are philosophy graduates. The chairperson of the committee is elected by the members of the foundation from among themselves every two years. The committee meets on a monthly basis.

The foundation convenes a general assembly each year. The assembly appoints members of the steering committee for the next year of activity, reviews the work done during the preceding year of activity, discusses and adopts amendments to PSF’s Foundation Deed, and approves the audited accounts of the foundation and cause them to be published.

Main organ

PSF's main organ — called SHARE — is published twice every year. The mission of SHARE is to serve as the official platform of the Philosophy Sharing Foundation, and to disseminate articles and information which contribute to philosophical discussion and debate. The magazine includes articles of a philosophical nature.

Appreciation

By its establishment, PSF introduced a new experience in Malta. Formerly, philosophical activities were restricted to academics somehow connected to the University of Malta. The foundation gave philosophy a wider audience. It involves the general public in philosophical discussions, and also offers evening courses to adult students. The foundation is a member of the International Federation of Philosophy Societies (FISP), and also of the Malta-EU Steering & Action Committee.

References

External links

 Philosophy in Malta

Organizations established in 2012
Philosophy organizations
Philosophical societies
Organisations based in Valletta
2012 establishments in Malta